Dylan Wells (born January 3, 1998) is a Canadian professional ice hockey goaltender for the Texas Stars of the American Hockey League (AHL) as a prospect to the Dallas Stars of the National Hockey League (NHL).

Playing career
Wells played junior hockey with the Peterborough Petes in the Ontario Hockey League (OHL) and was drafted by the Edmonton Oilers, in the fifth-round, 123rd overall, in the 2016 NHL Entry Draft. He was signed to a three-year, entry-level contract with the Oilers on May 18, 2017. 

During his tenure within the Oilers organization, Wells played between minor-league affiliates, the Bakersfield Condors of the AHL and the Wichita Thunder of the ECHL. 

Having spent the majority of the pandemic affected 2020–21 season on the Oilers taxi squad, Wells was traded at the conclusion of the season to the Carolina Hurricanes in exchange for future considerations on July 15, 2021. With his entry-level contract completed, Wells remained within the Hurricanes organization after signing a one-year AHL contract with affiliate, the Chicago Wolves, on August 11, 2021. 

Wells spent the majority of the 2021–22 season playing with the Wolves ECHL affiliate, the Norfolk Admirals, appearing in 43 games for 18 wins.

As a free agent from the Wolves, Wells opted to continue his professional career in the AHL after agreeing to a one-year contract with the Rockford IceHogs on July 14, 2022. Beginning the 2022–23 season with the IceHogs, Wells was signed to a one-year NHL contract by the Chicago Blackhawks on November 5, 2022, due to a rash of injuries. Serving as the Blackhawks' backup goaltender he surprisingly made his NHL debut, called into the game in a relief appearance against the Winnipeg Jets on November 5, 2022. He made 12 saves from 13 shots in the third period of a 4–0 defeat. Following his debut he was returned to the IceHogs on November 8.

On March 2, 2023, the Blackhawks traded Wells along with Max Domi to the Dallas Stars in exchange for Anton Khudobin and a second-round pick in the 2025 NHL Entry Draft.

Career statistics

Regular season and playoffs

International

Awards and honours

References

External links
 

1998 births
Living people
Bakersfield Condors players
Chicago Blackhawks players
Chicago Wolves players
Edmonton Oilers draft picks
Norfolk Admirals (ECHL) players
Peterborough Petes (ice hockey) players
Rockford IceHogs (AHL) players
Texas Stars players
Wichita Thunder players